John Stephen Curlewis, PC (31 March 1863 – 24 August 1940) was a South African lawyer and judge who served as the Chief Justice of the Union of South Africa between 1936 and 1938.

Background

Curlewis was born in Paarl, Cape Colony, the son of Rev. J.F. Curlewis the local rector at the Dutch Reformed Church. He was educated at the Diocesan College, Rondebosch, before joining the Cape Civil Service. He then took the LL.B at Cape University, and was called to the Bar of the Cape Supreme Court in 1887. He began to practice in Pretoria in 1888, before being appointed as a judge of the Transvaal High Court in 1903. In 1924 he became the Judge President of the Transvaal Provincial Division and in 1927 he was made a Judge of Appeal.

Curlewis became Chief Justice of the Union of South Africa in 1936, and was made a Privy Counsellor the following year. He resigned from the bench in 1938. He was also acting Governor-General of South Africa in 1933 from June until December under a dormant commission that was invoked.

References

1863 births
1940 deaths
People from Paarl
19th-century South African lawyers
20th-century South African judges
South African members of the Privy Council of the United Kingdom
South African Queen's Counsel
Chief justices of South Africa
Members of the Judicial Committee of the Privy Council
Alumni of Diocesan College, Cape Town